Halielloides verrilliana is a species of sea snail, a marine gastropod mollusk in the family Eulimidae. This species, along with Halielloides fragilis and Halielloides nitidus, belongs in the gastropod genus Halielloides.

Distribution
This species occurs in the following locations:

 North West Atlantic

Description 
The maximum recorded shell length is 6.5 mm.

Habitat 
Minimum recorded depth is 156 m. Maximum recorded depth is 3718 m.

References

External links

Eulimidae
Gastropods described in 1909